Incredibles 2 is a 2018 American computer-animated superhero film produced by Pixar Animation Studios and released by Walt Disney Pictures. Written and directed by Brad Bird, it is the sequel to The Incredibles (2004) and the second full-length installment of the franchise. The story follows the Incredibles as they try to restore the public's trust in superheroes while balancing their family life, only to combat a new opponent who seeks to turn the populace against all supers. Craig T. Nelson, Holly Hunter, Sarah Vowell and Samuel L. Jackson reprise their roles from the first film; newcomers to the cast include Huckleberry Milner, Bob Odenkirk, Catherine Keener and Jonathan Banks. Michael Giacchino returned to compose the score.

Following the success of The Incredibles, Bird postponed development on a sequel to work on other films. He attempted to distinguish the script from superhero films and superhero television series released since the first film, focusing on the family dynamic rather than the superhero genre.

Incredibles 2 premiered in Los Angeles on June 5, 2018, and was theatrically released in the United States on June 15, 2018 in Disney Digital 3D, Dolby Cinema, RealD 3D, IMAX, IMAX 3D, and 4DX formats. The film received positive reviews from critics, with praise for its animation, humor, writing, and musical score. The film made $182.7 million in its opening weekend, setting the record for best debut for an animated film, and grossed over $1.2 billion worldwide, making it the fourth-highest-grossing film of 2018, the second-highest-grossing animated film, and the 15th-highest-grossing film of all time during its theatrical run, along with being Pixar’s highest grossing film and the third to gross $1 billion after Finding Dory and Toy Story 3 and the highest grossing animated film in the United States and Canada. Incredibles 2 was named by the National Board of Review as the Best Animated Film of 2018. The film was nominated for Best Animated Feature Film at the 76th Golden Globe Awards and 91st Academy Awards, but lost both awards to Spider-Man: Into the Spider-Verse.

Plot 

Three months after defeating Syndrome, the Parr family (alias the Incredibles) and Lucius Best (alias Frozone) battle the Underminer and prevent him from destroying the city hall, but are unable to stop him from robbing a bank and escaping. The collateral damage gives the government the excuse to shut down the Superhero Relocation Program, denying the Parrs and other supers financial assistance. When Violet Parr's crush Tony Rydinger discovers her superhero identity, Agent Rick Dicker accidentally erases Tony's entire memory of her instead of just the event.

A wealthy businessman named Winston Deavor and his sister Evelyn, who run a media and telecommunications giant called DevTech, propose secret missions to Lucius, Helen Parr (alias Elastigirl) and Bob Parr (alias Mr. Incredible). These will be recorded and publicized, to regain public trust in superheroes. Winston chooses Helen for the initial missions, believing her to be less accident-prone than the men. Bob struggles in his new role as a stay-at-home parent, simultaneously trying to deal with Dash's math homework, Violet's heartache over Tony standing her up for their first date due to his memory wipe, and the chaos of baby Jack-Jack's burgeoning superpowers.

Edna Mode develops a suit to help control Jack-Jack's abilities. In the city of New Urbem, Helen encounters a supervillain known as "Screenslaver", who projects hypnotic images by hacking into monitors. After preventing him from destroying a crowded commuter train, and thwarting his attempt to kill an ambassador, she tracks him to an apartment building and unmasks him as a Pizza Planet worker, who says he cannot remember his actions. At a party celebrating the Screenslaver's arrest, Winston announces a summit of world leaders to legalize supers, hosted aboard his luxury yacht, the Everjust. 

Helen discovers the pizzeria worker is not the Screenslaver, but was being controlled by hypnotic goggles. Evelyn, the true Screenslaver, forces the goggles onto Helen and restrains her in a freezing room to limit her stretching abilities. Evelyn blames the public's reliance on supers for the deaths of her and Winston's parents; their father was killed by burglars while trying to contact a superhero to save him, and their mother later died of mourning. Evelyn plans to sabotage her brother's summit to irreparably tarnish the reputation of all supers, ensuring they remain outlawed for good and leave the public to solve their own issues.

Evelyn lures Bob into a trap, and sends a group of hypnotized supers to subdue his children. Lucius attempts to protect them, but is overwhelmed. Violet, Dash, and Jack-Jack escape in a refurbished Incredibile, the supercar once owned by their father, and reach Winston's yacht. Onboard, the hypnotized Bob, Helen and Lucius broadcast a vengeful speech painting supers as a threat, subdue the ship's crew, aim the ship at New Urbem, and smash the controls. Jack-Jack removes the goggles on Helen; she in turn frees Bob and Lucius. They release the other mind-controlled supers, and all work together to prevent the yacht from crashing into the city. 
 
Evelyn tries escaping in a plane, but is thwarted by Helen and arrested. Some time later, supers regain their legality, and Tony accompanies Violet to a movie with the family. When the Parrs spot an in-progress police chase, Violet leaves Tony at the theater, promising to be back in time. The Parrs then join the pursuit in their Incredibile.

Voice cast 

 Craig T. Nelson as Bob Parr / Mr. Incredible, the father of the family who possesses superhuman strength and limited invulnerability.
 Holly Hunter as Helen Parr / Elastigirl, the mother of the family who has the ability to stretch her body into many shapes and forms.
 Sarah Vowell as Violet Parr, the family's first child, who can become invisible and project force fields for limited lengths of time.
 Huckleberry Milner as Dashiell "Dash" Parr, the family's second child, who has superhuman speed. He was originally voiced by Spencer Fox in the first film.
 Eli Fucile as Jack-Jack Parr, the infant son of Bob and Helen who has a large assortment of powers.
 Nick Bird provides the vocal effects of Jack-Jack's monster form.
 Samuel L. Jackson as Lucius Best / Frozone, Bob's best friend, who has the ability to form ice from humidity.
 Bob Odenkirk as Winston Deavor, a superhero fan who leads a giant telecommunications company called DevTech, with his sister Evelyn, and wants to bring back superheroes by revamping the public's perception of them.
 Catherine Keener as Evelyn Deavor / Screenslaver, Winston's older sister, a technological genius who has never encountered a problem she could not solve. She is later revealed to be the "Screenslaver", a villain who hijacks screens and uses them to brainwash other people.
 Bill Wise provides the voice of Evelyn while wearing the Screenslaver mask, as well as a pizza delivery man hypnotized by Evelyn to pose as the "Screenslaver".
 Brad Bird as Edna "E" Mode, a fashion designer for superheroes and a close friend of the Parrs.
 Jonathan Banks as Rick Dicker, a government agent responsible for helping the Parrs stay undercover and unremarkable. When his department is shut down, the Parrs are left to their own devices. Banks replaces Bud Luckey from the first film, who died in 2018 with the film being dedicated to his memory.
 Michael Bird as Tony Rydinger, Violet's love interest.
 Sophia Bush as Karen / Voyd, an aspiring superhero with the power to create portals.
 Phil LaMarr as:
 Krushauer, an aspiring superhero with the power to telekinetically crush objects.
 He-Lectrix, an aspiring superhero with the power to control electricity.
 Paul Eiding as Gus Burns / Reflux, an elderly aspiring superhero who can vomit hot lava.
 Isabella Rossellini as Ambassador Selick, a foreign official committed to the support and legalization of superheroes. Rossellini reprised her role in the Italian dubbing of the movie.
 John Ratzenberger as The Underminer, a mole-like supervillain who seeks to bring war and destruction to the world.
 Barry Bostwick as the Mayor of New Urbem
 Jere Burns as Detective No. 1
 Adam Rodriguez as Detective No. 2
 Kimberly Adair Clark as Honey Best, Frozone's wife.
 Adam Gates as Chad Brentley, a talk show host.
 Usher as the unnamed valet of Winston Deaver who is a big fan of Frozone.

Additionally, Bret Parker reprises her role as babysitter Kari McKeen in a deleted scene.

Production

Development 
Following The Incredibles, Brad Bird directed his next film for Pixar, Ratatouille, which was released in June 2007. Near its premiere, Bird said he was open to an idea of a sequel to The Incredibles, but only if it could be better than the original. He stated, "I have pieces that I think are good, but I don't have them all together." In a May 2013 interview, Bird reiterated his interest in a sequel: "I have been thinking about it. People think that I have not been, but I have—because I love those characters, and love that world ... I have many, many elements that I think would work really well in another Incredibles film, and if I can get 'em to click all together, I would probably wanna do that." While publicizing the first film, Bird had already conceptualized the eventual approach where Bob and Helen would switch roles, and Jack-Jack would develop multiple powers unknown to the family.

At the Disney shareholder meeting in March 2014, Disney CEO and chairman Bob Iger confirmed that Pixar was working on an Incredibles sequel, and that Bird would return as both director and screenwriter. Bird started the script around April 2015, and said that the Incredibles sequel would be his next film after Tomorrowland.

Writing 
One challenge in writing Incredibles 2 was how to deal with the large number of superhero films and television series that had been released since the first film, such as the Marvel Cinematic Universe. To try to differentiate the sequel, Bird wanted to avoid tropes related to the superhero genre: "I don't think that kind of idea stays interesting for very long. For me, the interesting thing was never the superhero part of it. It was more the family dynamic, and how do superhero things play into that." He said he wanted to include some unused ideas from the first film, and that the new story would focus on Helen Parr / Elastigirl.

Though the sequel was released fourteen years after the first, Bird did not want to use a narrative element like an ellipsis or to come up with new characters, and instead continued from where the first film left off. This allowed him to keep characters with the same superpowers and not have to develop new ones, nor did he need to figure out how to deal with Violet and Dash being adults. This also allowed him to keep Jack-Jack as an infant with an array of powers, which Bird likened to how infants are able to understand numerous languages. While the plot of the 2005 follow-up video game to The Incredibles, The Incredibles: Rise of the Underminer, begins at that same point of time, the film discards the game's continuity. The film was produced with a production budget of $200 million.

Casting 
In November 2016, Pixar announced that Holly Hunter and Samuel L. Jackson would reprise their roles. During the 2017 D23 Expo, it was confirmed that Craig T. Nelson and Sarah Vowell would also reprise their roles, and that Spencer Fox, the original voice of Dashiell "Dash" Parr, would be replaced by younger newcomer Huckleberry Milner. Later that month, Bird and John Ratzenberger were, also, confirmed as reprising their characters from the first film.

In November 2017, Pixar announced that Bob Odenkirk and Catherine Keener had joined the cast. In January 2018, it was announced that Sophia Bush and Isabella Rossellini would voice new characters Voyd and The Ambassador, while Jonathan Banks would voice Rick Dicker after the character's original voice actor Bud Luckey retired in 2014; after his death in 2018, the film was dedicated to Luckey's memory.

Animation 
One advantage that Pixar had with Incredibles 2 was the advancement of technology the company had seen since the original film and a team of much more experienced animators. Producer John Walker said, "I think that one of the things that excited Brad and Ralph Eggleston, the production designer, was the fact that the technology existed now to finally realize the designs in the way that they had hoped to realize them in 2004. There were no notions of, 'Well, we don't know how to do long hair, we don't know how to do humans, we don't know how to do muscles.' Everybody knows how to do it. It's just now about doing it quickly." Because Pixar no longer used the same systems from the first film, all the characters had to be created from scratch on the computer again. The studio also used physically based human eye models for the characters for the first time, which possibly made the eyes larger and more stylized than that of real humans.

Music

In 2015, Bird confirmed that Michael Giacchino would return to compose the score. Giacchino began work around May 2017. The soundtrack album was released on June 15, 2018 and on CD two weeks later. In addition to the film's score, it includes the vocalized theme songs for Mr. Incredible, Frozone, and Elastigirl heard in the credits, as well as bonus versions of the songs sung by Disney's a cappella group, DCappella, and the latter's version of the track "The Glory Days" from the first film.

Marketing

Promotion 
A 53-second teaser trailer premiered on November 18, 2017 during ESPN's broadcast of College GameDay. It received 113.0 million views in its first 24 hours, becoming the most-viewed trailer for an animated film up until the release of the teaser trailer for Frozen II in February 2019, which surpassed it with 116.4 million views in its first 24 hours. It is also the 14th-most-viewed trailer overall. The studio spent a total of $150 million promoting the film. In the month of the release of the film, Elastigirl's new costume in Incredibles 2 was added in the video game Disney Magic Kingdoms, along with a limited time Event to unlock Jack-Jack.

Merchandise 
An Incredibles 2 graphic novel and comic miniseries was published by Dark Horse Comics in 2018. The graphic novel, titled Incredibles 2: Heroes at Home, was written by Liz Marsham and illustrated by Nicoletta Baldari. A comic miniseries, titled Incredibles 2: Crisis in Mid-Life! & Other Stories, was written by Christos Gage and Landry Walker, and illustrated by Gurihiru, J. Bone, Andrea Greppi and Roberta Zanotta. Christos Gage also wrote (with Jean Claudio-Vinci as illustrator) another series titled Incredibles 2: Secret Identities. The series, like his Crisis in Mid-Life! & Other Stories, focuses on what happens after the film. This particular series is about Violet, published in a single graphic novel by Dark Horse Comics on October 1, 2019.

In May 2018, a prose novel was released entitled Incredibles 2: A Real Stretch: An Elastigirl Prequel Story, which focuses on the life of the character Elastigirl before the events of the first film.

A Lego video game adaptation of both films was released on the same day as Incredibles 2.

Funko released several Pop! figures including a chase (1/6) variant of Violet in her invisible form, and several retail exclusives to Target and Hot Topic. There was a Jack-Jack as Edna Mode Pop! figure that released exclusively at San Diego Comic-Con in July 2018. In addition, Funko released several blind box mystery minis of characters from the film.

Figpin released a boxed set of 5 characters (Edna "E" Mode, Mr. Incredible, Elastigirl, Dash, and Violet) limited to 1000 pieces, which was released exclusively at the D23 Expo in August 2019. Numerous attendees camped out overnight to purchase the box set at the Figpin booth, which sold out quickly.

Release

Theatrical 
The official premiere of Incredibles 2 took place in Los Angeles on June 5, 2018. It was theatrically released in the United States on June 15, 2018, in IMAX and 3D. It is accompanied by Pixar's short film Bao. The film's release was originally scheduled for June 21, 2019, but the date was moved forward to 2018 as it was ahead of schedule, and Pixar handed the 2019 release date over to Toy Story 4.

Home media 
Incredibles 2 was released digitally on October 23, 2018, and on DVD, Blu-ray, and Ultra HD Blu-ray on November 6, 2018. The film made a revenue of $66.7 million from home video sales with 3.4 million units sold, making it the sixth best-selling title of 2018.

Reception

Box office 
Incredibles 2 grossed $608.6 million in the United States and Canada, and $634.2 million in other territories, for a total worldwide gross of $1.242 billion.

On July 1, 2018, the film passed $648 million at the worldwide box office, surpassing the $633 million the original film made in its entire theatrical run. It ended its run as the ninth-highest-grossing film of all time domestically and the highest-grossing animated film domestically. The film crossed the $1 billion mark on July 30, 2018, becoming the seventh animated film and the 36th film of all time to reach the milestone. It was also the fifth animated Disney film, the third Pixar film, and Disney's 18th film overall to gross $1 billion worldwide, as well as the fastest animated film to gross $1 billion, doing so in 46 days, surpassing Minions (49 days), but later being surpassed by The Lion King in 2019 (21 days), also made by Disney. On August 12, the film surpassed Toy Story 3 ($1.067 billion) to become the highest-grossing Pixar film worldwide. Deadline Hollywood calculated the net profit of the film to be $447.4 million, when factoring together all expenses and revenues, making it the third-most-profitable release of 2018.

United States and Canada 
In April 2018, early box office projections had Incredibles 2 grossing $110 million in its opening weekend in the United States and Canada. In May 2018, a month before the film's release, tracking revised to an opening weekend of $140 million or more. A week prior to the film's opening, Fandango reported that pre-sale of tickets for the film had exceeded that of previous mid-year blockbusters Finding Dory, Wonder Woman, Spider-Man: Homecoming and Suicide Squad at the same point in their release cycles. By the week of its release, opening weekend projections had reached upwards of $150 million. A day before release, it became Fandango's top pre-selling animated film of all time, outselling the previous record-holder, Finding Dory.

The film grossed $18.5 million from Thursday night previews, increasing weekend projections to as high as $174 million. The previews set the record for an animated film, doubling Finding Dorys $9.2 million, and were higher than the likes of fellow superhero films Spider-Man: Homecoming, Thor: Ragnarok and Justice League. It made $71.6 million on its first day, including previews, the best ever for an animated film (besting Dorys $54.7 million by 31%) and 14th-highest all time. It went on to debut to $182.7 million, the eighth-best opening of all time, far ahead of Finding Dorys animated record of $135.1 million and more than the entire lifetime gross of Pixar's A Bug's Life ($162.8 million), Cars 3 ($152.9 million), and The Good Dinosaur ($123.1 million).

The film set animated records for its Monday and Tuesday grosses, making $23.9 million (beating the $23.4 million made by Shrek 2 in May 2004) and $27.1 million (beating Finding Dorys $23.1 million), respectively. Its Tuesday gross also set a June record, topping Jurassic World ($24.3 million in 2015). By Thursday, its seventh day of release, the film had grossed $269.4 million, topping the entire lifetime domestic gross of the original, not accounting for inflation ($261.4 million). In its second weekend the film dropped 56% to $80.9 million, finishing second behind newcomer Jurassic World: Fallen Kingdom ($148 million), marking the first time two films opened to over $100 million in back-to-back weekends. It remained in second place in its third weekend, grossing $45.5 million and third in its fourth weekend with $29 million, respectively. On July 7, its 23rd day of release, the film crossed $495 million, passing Finding Dory to become the highest-grossing animated film and Pixar's highest-grossing film of all time domestically, and the following day became the first animated film to gross over $500 million domestically. On September 2, its 80th day of release, it became the first animated film to gross over $600 million domestically. Incredibles 2 ended its run at the box office as the third highest-grossing film of 2018 behind Black Panther and Avengers: Infinity War.

Internationally 
Outside the United States, the film made $51.5 million from 25 countries in its opening weekend, for a global debut of $231.5 million. This made it the biggest international opening weekend for an animated film, surpassing Ice Age: Dawn of the Dinosaurs. Mexico was the largest debut with $12.3 million, followed by Australia ($7.7 million) and Russia ($5.4 million). In its second weekend of release the film made $58.6 million from 28 countries, bringing its two-week total to $134.7 million. Its largest market was China where it made $21.2 million, the best-ever opening for a Pixar film in the country. It was also released in India where it made $3.3 million. In the United Kingdom, the film grossed $12.6 million in its opening weekend, the second-biggest opening for Pixar after Toy Story 3. , The biggest markets in terms of total earnings are the United Kingdom ($73.1 million), followed by China ($51.5 million), Japan ($43.9 million), France ($41.7 million), and Brazil ($37.6 million).

Critical response 
The website's critical consensus reads, "Incredibles 2 reunites Pixar's family crimefighting team for a long-awaited follow-up that may not quite live up to the original, but comes close enough to earn its name." On Metacritic, which assigns a normalized rating to reviews, the film has a weighted average score of 80 out of 100, based on 51 critics, indicating "generally favorable reviews". Audiences polled by CinemaScore gave the film a rare grade of "A+" on an A+ to F scale, the same score as the first film, and those at PostTrak gave the film a 93% overall positive score and an 83% "definite recommend".

Robert Abele of TheWrap, praised the film, saying, "Whatever the opposite of phoning in a sequel is, that's Brad Bird's progressive-minded, thunderously fun mix of super saves, throwback aesthetics and family comedy." A.A. Dowd, writing for The A.V. Club, felt it was "A sparkling contraption of an animated comedy, funny and often wondrous in its midcentury-modern vision of an alternate America frozen in the amber of a bygone idealism." David Ehrlich of IndieWire, gave the film a "B+", saying, "When the Parrs are pushed out of their comfort zone, Bird settles into his... [after] inciting a Spielberg-level monorail chase that reaffirms Bird's lucid gift for kinetic and character-driven action filmmaking, the movie blasts off and never looks back." Stephanie Zacharek from Time considered it "bold [and] rapturously entertaining," while David Sims at The Atlantic, dubbed it "dazzling, thought-provoking, and sometimes overwhelming in terms of plotting." Peter Travers of Rolling Stone, gave the film a 3.5 out of 4 stars and said, "Long-awaited follow-up brings back everyone's favorite superhero family—and suggests that we should give our caped-crusader pop obsessions a rest." Manohla Dargis of The New York Times, wrote a positive review of the film, saying, "The family that fights together remains the steadily throbbing, unbreakable heart of Incredibles 2, even when Bob and Helen swap traditional roles. There's something too self-conscious—overcompensating much?"

Variety's Owen Gleiberman called the film "fun but far from incredible" and wrote "It's true that the Toy Story films, all three of which are fantastic, did variations on the same theme of a toy's obsolescence, but as movies they kept the emotions close to the surface. In Incredibles 2, we never get that rush of feeling." Mark Kermode of The Guardian gave the film four out of five stars and said, "Slapstick genius, profound social comment and a monstrously funny infant combine to conjure a magical second outing for the superhero family." John Nugent of Empire magazine also gave the film four out of five stars, saying, "There's some quibbles to be had in an over-familiar setup, and an under-served villain, but overall this is a gloriously fun family parable, and as entertaining as any superhero movie you'll see this year." Brian Tellerico of Rogerebert.com, gave the film 3.5 out of 4 stars and said, "...Incredibles 2 understands something that most family sequels, even the Pixar ones, fail to comprehend—we don't just want to repeat something we loved before. We want to love it all over again. You will with Incredibles 2." Michael Phillips of the Chicago Tribune, gave the film 2.5 out of 4 stars and said, "Incredibles 2 is content to punch the clock and stick to straight, bombastic action mode. In that mode, composer Giacchino's music is the most successful element, running nimble, beautifully orchestrated variations on themes that feel familiar in the best ways while retaining their spark. The animation is bright and visually dynamic. The script, well ... if the title were Satisfactories 2, it'd be about right." Ty Burr for The Boston Globe called it a "clattery, unfocused affair that at times is more irritating than fun." Todd McCarthy of The Hollywood Reporter, gave the film a positive review, saying: "Boosted by central characters that remain vastly engaging and a deep supply of wit, Incredibles 2 certainly proves worth the wait, even if it hits the target but not the bull's-eye in quite the way the first one did."

Health hazards/epilepsy problems 

Many disability advocates, including the Epilepsy Foundation, have raised concerns that movie scenes with flashing lights, including that in Incredibles 2 of Elastigirl's fight with the Screenslaver, can trigger seizures in viewers affected by photosensitive epilepsy. As a result, several theaters posted warnings for audiences. Disney told USA Today that it appreciated those efforts, and then, in a memo, asked all theaters exhibiting the movie to warn audiences: "Incredibles 2 contains a sequence of flashing lights, which may affect customers who are susceptible to photosensitive epilepsy or other photosensitivities."

In response to this, a re-edited version was released in the United Kingdom with all affected sequences altered so that any flashing lights and strobe effects now pass the Harding test.

Accolades

Possible sequel 
Following the release of Incredibles 2, director Brad Bird acknowledged that the film's truncated production schedule resulted in many plotlines and ideas he had for the film being cut from the final version. He cited Pixar's decision in October 2016 to swap the release dates of Toy Story 4 and Incredibles 2, which meant that Bird's film lost a full year of production. Bird stated that the lingering plotlines could lead to a third installment, just as they did with the second. "There were a lot of ideas that we had on this film that could be [used]... whether it's another Incredibles film, or something else." Cast members including Samuel L. Jackson and Sophia Bush have expressed interest in reprising their roles. Producer John Walker would not "rule [a third film] out".

Notes

References

External links 
 
 
 
 
 

2018 films
2018 comedy films
2018 computer-animated films
2018 3D films
2018 action comedy films
2010s animated superhero films
2010s superhero comedy films
American 3D films
American action comedy films
American children's animated action films
American children's animated superhero films
American computer-animated films
American sequel films
Animated films about families
Animated films about shapeshifting
Animated superhero comedy films
Film controversies
Annie Award winners
Disney controversies
Films set in the 1960s
2010s English-language films
Films about invisibility
Film censorship in the United Kingdom
Film controversies in the United Kingdom
Film controversies in the United States
Films directed by Brad Bird
Films about hypnosis
Films produced by John Walker
Films scored by Michael Giacchino
Films set on ships
Films with screenplays by Brad Bird
Fiction about government
IMAX films
The Incredibles
Fiction about memory erasure and alteration
Fiction about mind control
Midlife crisis films
Pixar animated films
Walt Disney Pictures animated films
3D animated films
4DX films
2010s American films